Bears is a 2014 American nature documentary film about a family of brown bears living in the coastal mountain ranges of Alaska. Directed by Alastair Fothergill and Keith Scholey and narrated by John C. Reilly, Bears was released theatrically by Disneynature on April 18, 2014, the seventh nature documentary released under that label. It generally received positive reviews from critics.

Plot
In Katmai National Park and Preserve in Alaska, a Alaskan brown bear mother named Sky gives birth to two cubs named Scout and Amber in her den on a mountain slope. When April comes, the bears are ready to leave the den. As the bears leave, the oncoming summer brings with it a threat of avalanches. The bears are able to avoid the disasters. Upon reaching the lush valley below, the cubs meet the other bears, some of which pose a threat to the cubs; among these bears are Magnus, a big healthy male who dominates the valley, and his rival Chinook, an older male. The family works together to survive the spring, with Sky keeping the cubs safe from Tikaani, a pesky lone wolf. The cubs get to know how to defend themselves in encounters with Tikaani.  The family also stays clear of the frequent dominance fights between Magnus and Chinook.

As the spring wears on, the cubs learn about how to catch food. Sky leads the cubs to the mudflats to dig up clams hiding under the mud. The family has a good time until the tide turns. In the chaos, Scout gets stranded on a sandbar. Unable to do much, Sky can only look on as the cub tries to free himself. He finally comes to his senses and swims over to Sky. The family heads back to higher ground, where, after another encounter with Magnus, Chinook attacks again. As Sky fights off the male bear, Amber and Scout hide in a nearby log. After Chinook is driven away, Amber reappears from the log, but Scout is nowhere to be seen. Sky looks for him all day, but to no avail. Eventually, just as Sky and Amber are about to give up searching, Scout comes right back out of the log he had been hiding in the whole time.

When summer comes, so does the yearly salmon run. Dozens of bears gather along salmon streams on the coast & the rivers, especially the Great Falls, where only adult males are allowed, to get the best of the run before it ends. This also leads in an increase in dominance fights between Magnus and Chinook. Sky, meanwhile, is looking for a different place to find food, the Golden Pond, where bears can make the best of the salmon run peacefully. After feasting on washed up mussels & rock eels in a hidden sanctuary, & the cubs having their first taste of salmon while going up river towards, a raven leads Sky and her two cubs to the direction of the Golden Pond just in time to save the brown bear family from their starvation. She and her cubs leave Katmai and head north to Lake Clark National Park and Preserve, where the Golden Pond awaits, filled with salmon. After the family fill themselves on the riches of the feast, they head back to Katmai as winter approaches. When the first snow arrives, all the bears head back up the mountains to their dens to sleep out the harsh cold winter. The cubs have learned a lot from their first year which will greatly help them for the rest of their lives.

Production
The central brown bear family was filmed at Katmai National Park and Preserve in Alaska. Fothergill and Scholey previously directed African Cats together.

Olivia Holt sang her song "Carry On" for the movie. The song "Home" by Phillip Phillips appeared in the trailer and in the movie.

Release
Bears was released in the United States on April 18, 2014, four days before Earth Day.

Home media
Bears was released on Blu-ray and DVD combo pack on August 12, 2014.

Reception

Critical response 
Rotten Tomatoes gave the film a score of 90% based on reviews from 60 critics, with an average score of 7.10/10, with the critical consensus listed as saying "Sweet, beautifully filmed, and admirably short on sugarcoating, Bears continues Disneynature's winning streak." On Metacritic, which assigns a rating out of 100 based on reviews from critics, the film has a score of 68 based on 20 reviews, indicating "generally favorable reviews."

Accolades

References

External links
  at Disney.com
 
 

2014 films
2014 documentary films
American documentary films
American pregnancy films
Disneynature films
Films scored by George Fenton
Documentary films about bears
Films directed by Alastair Fothergill
Films set in Alaska
Films shot in Alaska
American independent films
Films set in North America
Grizzly bears in popular culture
Documentary films about Alaska
2010s English-language films
2010s American films